Lady Sybil Grey  (15 July 1882 – 4 June 1966) was a British philanthropist and Voluntary Aid Detachment nurse.

Early life
Grey was born as the second daughter to Albert Grey, 4th Earl Grey and his wife Alice Holford, the daughter of Robert Stayner Holford. She was raised in Northumberland. During her time in England, she competed at rifle ranges and horse racing. In 1904, her family moved to Ottawa, Ontario, Canada where her father would serve as the Governor General of Canada.

Career
In 1906, Grey and 15 Ottawa women cofounded the Ottawa chapter of the Imperial Order Daughters of the Empire (IODE), a patriotic club to support Canadian troops fighting overseas during the War. Another part of her efforts during the First World War was serving as a Voluntary Aid Detachment nurse at a hospital in Northumbria. She transformed her family home in Northumberland into a hospital to look after 400 patients during the war.

In October 1915, Grey moved to Russia to establish an Anglo-Russian Hospital with Lady Muriel Paget, which would go on to treat 8,000 Russian soldiers over two years. She co-founded the Red Cross hospital with Lady Muriel Paget from 1915-1918, despite The British Journal of Nursing (BJN) dismissing their efforts due to their lack of experience. In the first year the hospital was open, the admitted few injured and wounded men, but experienced an uptake in February 1916. During her stay at the Russian field hospital, she suffered a facially injury as a result of a hand grenade. However, she continued her nursing efforts and eventually spent nearly a year in France leading the Women’s Legion. However, by 1917, she returned to England to stay with her dying father and worked at the Dorchester House. Grey once again returned to the front line of the war efforts soon after and married Lambert Middleton.

She was made an Officer of the Order of the British Empire at the 1918 Birthday Honours for her efforts during the war.

Further reading
Lady Sybil: Empire, War and Revolution
The Forgotten Hospital

References

1882 births
1966 deaths
Red Cross personnel
Officers of the Order of the British Empire
Female wartime nurses
Female nurses in World War I
People from Northumberland
British humanitarians
British women in World War I
Daughters of British earls
Wives of baronets
20th-century British philanthropists